Chorizema aciculare, commonly known as needle-leaved chorizema, is a species of flowering plant in the family Fabaceae and is endemic to the southwest of Western Australia. It is a shrub with sharply-pointed leaves, the flower colour depending on subspecies.

Description
The flowers of subspecies aciculare are pink or orange, those of subsp. laxum usually pale yellow or orange.

Taxonomy
Needle-leaved chorizema was first formally described in 1825 by Augustin Pyramus de Candolle who gave it the name Podolobium aciculare in Annales des Sciences Naturelles. In 1930, Charles Gardner changed the name to Chorizema aciculare in his  Enumeratio Plantarum Australiae Occidentalis. The specific epithet (aciculare) means "needle-pointed", referring to the leaves.

In 1992, Joan M. Taylor and Michael Crisp described two subspecies of C. aciculare in Australian Systematic Botany , and the names are accepted by the Australian Plant Census:
 Chorizema aciculare (DC.) C.A.Gardner subsp. aciculare;
 Chorizema aciculare subsp. laxum J.M.Taylor & Crisp.

Distribution and habitat
Chorizema aciculare mostly grows in woodland or coastal kwongan on granite outcrops, undulating plains, ridges or on coastal dunes and is widespread from near Geraldton to Israelite Bay in the south-west of Western Australia.

References 

Mirbelioids
Plants described in 1825
Fabales of Australia
Flora of Western Australia
Taxa named by Augustin Pyramus de Candolle